Andrei Valeryevich Bubchikov (born 24 September 1979) is a former Russian professional football player.

Club career
He played two seasons in the Russian Football National League for FC Avangard Kursk and FC Oryol.

External links
 
 

1979 births
Living people
Sportspeople from Ivanovo
Russian footballers
Association football midfielders
Russian expatriate footballers
Expatriate footballers in Belarus
FC Tekstilshchik Ivanovo players
FC Oryol players
FC Torpedo-BelAZ Zhodino players
FC Sheksna Cherepovets players
FC Avangard Kursk players